Charmus laneaus is a species of non-venomous scorpion in the family Buthidae endemic to Sri Lanka.

Description
Total body length of male is 14 mm and female is 21.3 mm. Mesosoma, carapace, metasoma and telson of the male is black. Eyes are surrounded by black pigment. 
Mesosoma brownish with thin reddish spots. Pedipalp femur entirely black with many small yellow spots. Pedipalp patella is yellowish many black spots. Legs are yellow in color with black spots. There is a reddish yellow longitudinal strip over tergites I to VI. All metasomal segments are brownish. Venter reddish yellow except reddish brown sternite VII. Chelicerae brown, with black reticulation. Carapace granular without carinae. Tergites I to VI are granular with one carina. Sternites also without carinae. Pectines, sternum and coxapophysis are reddish yellow. Pectines with or without fulcra. There are 16 to 18 pectinal teeth. Chelicerae fingers are reddish yellow with yellowish teeth. Telson vesicle is punctate, which is bulbous in male. Manus with dark reticulated patterns on both dorsum and ventrum.

References

Buthidae
Animals described in 1879
Endemic fauna of Sri Lanka